Mount Ballou is a pinnacle-type mountain (2,900 m) which forms the south end of Pain Mesa and the north side of the entrance to Pinnacle Gap in the Mesa Range, Victoria Land, Antarctica. The mountain was first mapped by the United States Geological Survey (USGS) from surveys and U.S. Navy air photos, 1960–64. Named by Advisory Committee on Antarctic Names (US-ACAN) for Commander Justin G. Ballou, U.S. Navy, officer in charge of the Detachment A winter party at McMurdo Station, 1966. The mountain lies on the Pennell Coast, a portion of Antarctica lying between Cape Williams and Cape Adare.

Mountains of Victoria Land
Pennell Coast